Koštana (Serbian Cyrillic: Коштана) is a popular play, written by Borisav Stanković. It is set in Stanković's native Vranje, a town in southern Serbia. It features many themes of Serbian folklore and patriarchal customs which were still present in the late nineteenth century. The play is very popular to this day.

The Serbian composer Petar Konjović wrote an opera of the same name based on the play.

Serbian plays
Plays set in the 19th century
Vranje
1902 plays
Serbia in fiction
Plays set in Serbia